KCMO is the abbreviation for Kansas City, Missouri, informally.

KCMO may refer to:

 KCMO (AM), a radio station (710 AM) licensed to Kansas City, Missouri, United States
 KCMO-FM, a radio station (94.9 FM) licensed to Kansas City, Missouri, United States
 KCTV (TV), a television station (channel 5) licensed to Kansas City, Missouri, United States, which used the call signs KCMO and KCMO-TV until March 1983